Miha Kokol (born 23 November 1989) is a Slovenian football defender who plays for Deutsch Goritz.

References

External links
PrvaLiga profile 

1989 births
Living people
Sportspeople from Maribor
Slovenian footballers
Association football fullbacks
Slovenian PrvaLiga players
NK Maribor players
NK Nafta Lendava players
NK Drava Ptuj players
NK Aluminij players
NK Zavrč players
ND Gorica players
FC Koper players
Slovenian expatriate footballers
Expatriate footballers in Austria
Slovenian expatriate sportspeople in Austria
Slovenia youth international footballers